Ratliff Stadium is a stadium in Odessa, Texas.  It is primarily used for American football, and is the home field for the city's two public high schools, Odessa and Permian High Schools.

The stadium opened in 1982 and holds 17, 931 people (capacity was reduced from the original 19,302 people when additional handicapped seating and accommodations were added in 2008).  It was the stadium used during filming of most of the football action in the 2004 movie Friday Night Lights, an adaptation of a 1990 book about Permian's 1988 football season.

As of 2015, Ratliff Stadium also serves as the home game venue for the University of Texas of the Permian Basin (UTPB) Falcons Football team.

Other events held at Ratliff Stadium have included track and field, soccer, marching band contests, and graduation ceremonies.

References

External links

Sports in Odessa, Texas
High school football venues in Texas
Buildings and structures in Ector County, Texas
University of Texas Permian Basin
Texas–Permian Basin Falcons football